Mbweka is a settlement in Kenya's Busia County.

Approximate population for 7 km radius from this point: 91,823

References 

Populated places in Western Province (Kenya)
Busia County